Walter Percival "Percy" Wright (March 19, 1909 – September 1, 1992) was a Canadian politician. He won one of the three seats in the electoral district of Victoria City for the British Columbia Social Credit Party during the 1953 British Columbia general election but did not serve. He resigned on October 19, 1953, to provide a seat to Einar Maynard Gunderson; however, Gunderson was unsuccessful in the resulting by-election held on November 24, 1953, and the Liberal George Gregory won the seat instead. Wright did not run in any subsequent provincial or federal elections.

References

1909 births
1992 deaths
British Columbia Social Credit Party MLAs
People from Moose Jaw
Politicians from Victoria, British Columbia